Mu Sigma Upsilon Sorority, Incorporated is a multicultural intercollegiate sorority founded on November 21, 1981 at Rutgers University, New Brunswick and is recognized as the First Multicultural Sorority in the Nation. It is a non-profit Greek-lettered organization for college-educated women that promotes the goals of Academic Achievement, Unity Amongst All Women, and University and Community Service. Mu Sigma Upsilon is a multicultural-based sorority in the United States and a founding member of the National Multicultural Greek Council.

History
In the early 1980s, more women from culturally diverse backgrounds were pursuing college degrees. Five women came together and decided to create a support system for these women. Mu Sigma Upsilon was founded on November 21, 1981, at Rutgers University, New Brunswick, as a Social Fellowship. The five Founding Mothers of Mu Sigma Upsilon are:

 Eve Bracero - Puerto Rican
 Lillian Sierra - Puerto Rican
 Karinee Candelario - Puerto Rican
 Ruth Gonzalez - Puerto Rican
 Sylvia Vigo - Puerto Rican
In the early 1980s, Mu Sigma Upsilon became the first sorority to be founded with a multicultural, rather than a specific ethnic or cultural, base. Mu Sigma Upsilon became a Greek-lettered organization in the early 1990s. It is the sister organization of Lambda Sigma Upsilon, a Latino-based fraternity.

R.A.C.E  is a national event of the sorority. Each chapter runs its version of the event, where campus cultural organizations are invited to perform in costume and provide cultural displays for table-top exhibitions during the event. Members are encouraged to wear national dress about their cultural background or heritage and provide sample delicacies from all parts of the world.

Symbols and Traditions 
Motto: Mujeres Siempre Unidas / Women Always United

Official Colors: Baby Blue and White

Official Mascot: The Amazon woman, strong, fierce and independent.

Nicknames: The Sophisticated Ladies of MSU, or The MUs (pronounced mews) for short.

Philanthropy 
Every five years, the organization selects a national philanthropy as beneficiary. Through this process, we are able to dedicate ourselves as a national organization to aiding a single charity organization for five years at a time, and continue to assist many more organizations in the future. Previous philanthropies include:

 Mavin Foundation
 Women In Need NYC
 Ovarian Cancer National Alliance
 Girls Inc
 Keep A Breast Foundation
 The Girl Effect
 To Write Love On Her Arms

Mu Sigma Upsilon's current philanthropy for 2021-2026 is: The National Association for the Advancement of Colored People (NAACP)

Mu Sigma Upsilon Foundation 
The Mu Sigma Upsilon Foundation Inc. is a 501(c)(3) charitable non-profit organization. The mission of the foundation is to provide essential support and financial resources for the educational, leadership, and charitable purposes of the sorority to enrich the lives of members and assist in improving the community in which they serve.

T.I.A.R.A. Interest Group
T.I.A.R.A. stands for Togetherness, Independence, Academics, Respect and Achievement. The T.I.A.R.A. Group is the official interest group of Mu Sigma Upsilon. Being an active T.I.A.R.A. gives interested ladies the opportunity to get an in-depth look at the sisterhood. They experience first-hand what it would be like to be a sister of MSU through event/meeting planning, programming, fundraising and networking. It also allows for the prospective members to build relationships with one another and Mu Sigma Upsilon sisters.

Chapters

Undergraduate Chapters

Mu Sigma Upsilon does not name their chapters by the Greek alphabet, but rather chapters are given culturally significant names. Active chapters are indicated in bold. Inactive chapters are indicated in italic.

Graduate Chapter (Aretias) 
Mu Sigma Upsilon's Aretias Graduate Chapter provides alumnae members with a system to become mentors and advisers to each other and to undergraduates. The chapter remains actively involved in academic programs at undergraduate chapters and surrounding communities with or without an undergraduate chapter. The Aretias Chapter also offers interested women the opportunity to join the sorority at the Graduate level. Women interested in joining MSU’s Aretias Chapter would have completed an undergraduate program with a minimum 3.0 grade point average, or be actively pursuing a degree of higher education. 

Local Aretias Chapters:

 Aretias North New Jersey
 Aretias Pennsylvania
 Aretias New York
 Aretias New England
 Aretias Central Florida

References

National Multicultural Greek Council
Student societies in the United States
Student organizations established in 1981
Women's organizations based in the United States
1981 establishments in New Jersey